Richard Speiser (born 3 May 1987) was a German motorcycle racer who competed in Grasstrack, Longtrack and Speedway.

World Longtrack Championship

Grand-Prix Years

 2009 - 4 apps (9th) 67pts
 2010 - 6 apps (Third) 103pts
 2011 - 6 apps (Second) 103pts
 2012 - Did not compete
 2013 - 6 apps (7th) 81pts
 2014 - 2 apps (12th) 16pts

Best Grand-Prix Results
  Vechta First 2013, Third 2010, 2011
  Mariánské Lázně Second 2011
  Herxheim Third 2009

Team Championship

 2009  Eenrum (First) 0/47pts (Rode with Gerd Riss, Matthias Kröger, Enrico Janoschka)
 2010  Morizès (First) 14/49pts (Rode with Matthias Kröger, Stephan Katt, Martin Smolinski)
 2011  Scheeßel (First) 19/56pts (Rode with Stephan Katt, Jörg Tebbe, Martin Smolinski)
 2013  Folkestone (4th) 16/44pts (Rode with Stephan Katt, Jörg Tebbe, Enrico Janoschka)

European Grasstrack Championship

 2008  Siddeburen (Second) 13pts
 2009 Semi-finalist
 2010  La Réole (4th) 17pts
 2011  Thorpe St Peter (15th) 4pts
 2012 Did not compete
 2013  Bielefeld (Third) 18pts
 2014  St. Macaire (17th) 3pts

External links

References

German speedway riders
German motorcycle racers
1987 births
Living people
Individual Speedway Long Track World Championship riders
Sportspeople from Swabia (Bavaria)
People from Kempten im Allgäu